George Eliot was the pen name of English novelist Mary Ann Evans (1819–1880) 

George Eliot may also refer to:

George Eliot (spy) (before 1555—after 1581), English confidence man, a/k/a George Elliott, who arrested Edmund Campion
George Augustus Eliot (1784–1835), English and Canadian Army officer, son of Francis Perceval Eliot
George Fielding Eliot (1894–1971), Australian military analyst and author

See also
George Eliot Hospital NHS Trust, English institution in Nuneaton, Warwickshire
George Eliot Hospital, English medical building in Nuneaton, Warwickshire
George Eliot Academy, English secondary school in Nuneaton, Warwickshire
George Elliot (disambiguation)
George Elliott (disambiguation)